Joaquina Cabrera (21 August 1836 – 3 July 1908) was the de facto First Lady of Guatemala and mother of Guatemalan President Manuel Estrada Cabrera. She had a large amount of influence on her son's government and she would be honored on her birthday after her death as if she were still alive. Her funeral, which took place on 4–5 July 1908, began in Guatemala City and traveled through Amatitlán, Escuintla and Mazatenango before returning by train to her home town of Quetzaltenango, Guatemala.

Early life

Joaquina Cabrera was born to parents Valeriano Arévalo and Juana Cabrera in Quetzaltenango, Guatemala on 21 August 1836, but her parents would separate shortly thereafter. Much is unknown about Cabrera's early life but for the details recorded in historian Rafael Arévalo Martínez's book ¡Ecce Pericles! and the official Guatemalan government mouthpieces Álbumes de Minerva and La Locomotora, the latter of those once referring to Cabrera as "the Distinguished Doña Joaquina Cabrera de Estrada" even though she was not married. Historians generally agree that Cabrera and her son Manuel Estrada Cabrera led a humble life making and selling confectioneries in the streets of Quetzaltenango and catering for wealthy families in the locality such as the Aparicios. According to the Guatemalan writer , when Manuel was born, Joaquina left him in the care of a priest living next door to her, Pedro Estrada Monzón, who gave his surname (Estrada) to the boy.

Notes

Footnotes

Citations

References
Books

 

News

 

1836 births
1908 deaths
First ladies of Guatemala
People from Quetzaltenango